Jacaranda Books is a diversity-led British independent book publishing firm launched in 2012 and known for their effort tackling the gap between white authors and the BAME (Black, Asian and minority ethnic) demographic in United Kingdom's publishing industry.

History 

Jacaranda Books was founded in December 2011 in London by Valerie Brandes after she left Profile Books. with the purpose of promoting inclusivity and diversity in publishing and continuing the legacy of pioneers of diverse publishing such as Margaret Busby, Verna Wilkins, Eric Huntley and Jessica Huntley.

At the time of foundation, according to professor Claire Squires (Professor of Publishing Studies, and Director of the Stirling Centre for International Publishing and Communication at the University of Stirling), the publishing industry in United Kingdom had a homogenised white, middle-class and Oxbridge-dominated workforce. This was reflected in the content published in the industry as a whole, which mirrored the situation.

Jacaranda Books' strategy was to address the lack of diversity and the culture of risk aversion in the industry by publishing worldwide renowned titles (such as Rest in Power: The Enduring Life of Trayvon Martin) and award-winning authors (including Bernice McFadden, Fiston Mwanza Mujila, Anietie Isong and Irenosen Okojie), some of whom were previously unpublished in the UK.

Six years later, across 90 per cent of the book publishing industry in the UK the situation remained the same. In 2018, Jacaranda partnered with the creative communications agency Words Of Colour to call for submissions for TwentyIn2020 and publish 20 black British writers in the year 2020, which would be a first in publishing history. Later in 2018 11.6 per cent of the workforce in publishing was identified as BAME, reaching 13.0 per cent by 2019.

#TwentyIn2020 

In February 2018, Jacaranda Books released a call for submissions for Twenty In 2020, which started a chain reaction on the industry: Hachette launched Dialogue Books headed by Sharmaine Lovegrove in May 2018 (publicly inspired by Jacaranda Books, and signing Irenosen Okojie), Penguin Random House launched #Merky Books headed by Stormzy in October 2018, and HarperCollins appointed Nancy Adimora to a new diversity area in February 2020.

A year after the call for submissions the national press made echo of the campaign, and historical partnerships were begun with the London Library and other partners like Foyles.

By 2020 Jacaranda's TwentyIn2020 remains the biggest collection of black authors published in the same year, an effort that was recognised in July 2020 when Jacaranda was awarded the title of "Small Press of the Year" at The Booksellers British Book Awards.

#AQuickTingOn 

In September 2019 Jacaranda announced another campaign A Quick Ting On, a groundbreaking new non-fiction series focused on the black British community, all written by young black British writers. A similar series was later announced by #Merky Books including Anthony Anaxagorou, an author previously published by Jacaranda Books.

#InclusiveIndies and the #BlackLivesMatter movement 

In July 2013, Black Lives Matter movement began on social media after the Trayvon Martin case. The book Rest in Power: The Enduring Life of Trayvon Martin narrates the facts that began the movement, it was published in United States by Penguin, but not in United Kingdom, where it is published by Jacaranda as part of their stand for diversity.

In June 2020, Jacaranda in partnership with Knights Of collected £160k in the crowdfunding campaign #InclusiveIndies. This was an appeal to try to assure their survival in the face of the COVID-19 pandemic. The appeal won extra traction through the BlackLivesMatter movement of 2020.

After the campaign, the founder of Jacaranda was interviewed in 5 News by Claudia-Liza Armah on "Why diverse literature is important for society to tackle racism".

Impact on the industry and culture 

In 2013 staff member Jazzmine Breary contributed to the report Writing The Future: Black and Asian Authors Publishers in the Market Place. In 2018 she participated on the jury at the Young British Muslim Writers Awards. As sales, publicity and marketing manager, she was named one of The Booksellers rising stars in 2020.

Jacaranda's founder, Valerie Brandes, was listed consecutively in the Powerlist 2018 and Powerlist 2019 as one of the 100 most influential black Britons, a list shared with such other personalities as Meghan, Duchess of Sussex.

In 2019 staff member Magdalene Abraha left Bloomsbury Publishing to join Jacaranda, and the same year she was named among The Booksellers rising stars.

To mark the company's 20th anniversary in 2022, Jacaranda announced 10 exclusive editions of its most popular titles.

References

External links
 Official website

Book publishing companies based in London
British companies established in 2011
Publishing companies established in 2011